The Way Some People Live is a collection of 30 works of short fiction by John Cheever, published in 1943 by Random House.

The stories in this edition, represents most of Cheever's literary output written in his twenties. While Cheever resisted reissuing these works in a collection, a number of the stories whose copyrights have elapsed were issued by Academy Chicago Publishers in Fall River and Other Collection Stories (1994).

Stories
The thirty works of short fiction included in The Way Some People Live were originally published individually in literary journals, among them The New Yorker, The Yale Review and Story.:

Publishing background
The thirty short stories selected for publication in The Way Some People Live are a sampling of the more than 40 short stories Cheever wrote between 1930 and 1943. These depression-era works appeared in a number of literary journals, including Collier's, The New Republic, The Yale Review, Story and The New Yorker.
The volume was published in 1943 by Random House under the auspices of its co-founder Bennett Cerf, while Cheever was serving in a US infantry unit. When The Way Some People Live appeared in print, it came to the attention of his superior officers, and Cheever, a private first class, was transferred to the Signal Corps in Astoria, Queens, to write "scripts for antifascist propaganda films." Cheever's former combat unit, were deployed to North Africa and later to European theater, suffering extremely high casualty rates.

Biographer Blake Bailey reports the volume was "published in a first printing of 2,750 copies, The Way Some People Live sold just under 2000 copies at full price."

Cheever persistently resisted efforts to reissue selections from The Way Some People Live in subsequent collections of his work, describing these early efforts as "embarrassingly immature."

Despite Cheever's aversion to these stories, biographer Patrick Meanor considers several of the works "masterpieces."

Reception
The Way Some People Live received measured approval among critics upon its release. The Saturday Reviews Struthers Burt recognized Cheever as a rising literary talent, while Weldon Kees in The New Republic cautioned the author to avoid formulaic writing which a number of critics deemed typical of The New Yorker short fiction writers.

Critical assessment
Biographer Patrick Meanor comments on the style, subject matter and themes that characterize these "vignettes" comprising The Way Some People Live.:

Biographer Lynne Waldeland considers The Way Some People Live "a respectable volume for a writer's first collected fiction [that] would soon be overshadowed by the stories which were published in his next book, The Enormous Radio and Other Stories.(1953)."

Footnotes

Sources 
Bailey, Blake. 2009 (1). Notes on Text in John Cheever: Collected Stories and Other Writing. The Library of America. Pp. 1025-1028 
Bailey, Blake. 2009 (2). Cheever: A Life. Alfred A. Knopf, New York. 770 pp. 
O'Hara, James E. 1989. John Cheever: A Study of the Short Fiction. Twayne Publishers, Boston Massachusetts. Twayne Studies in Short Fiction no 9. 
Meanor, Patrick. 1995. John Cheever Revisited. Twayne Publishers, New York. 
Waldeland, Lynne. 1979. John Cheever. Twayne Publishers, G. K. Hall & Company, Boston, Massachusetts. 

1943 short story collections
American short story collections
Short story collections by John Cheever
Random House books